Deutsch-Polnische Begegnungsschule! „Willy-Brandt-Schule“ in Warschau (WBS) is a German international school with a 1-12 campus and a Kindergarten campus in Warsaw, Poland. It serves Grundschule (primary school) through Sekundarstufe II (senior high school or secondary school level II).

See also

 German minority in Poland

References

External links

  Willy-Brandt-Schule
  Willy-Brandt-Schule
  
  

Warsaw
International schools in Warsaw
Willy Brandt